Air Eagles is a 1931 American pre-Code action film starring Lloyd Hughes, Norman Kerry, and Shirley Grey.

Cast
 Lloyd Hughes as Bill Ramsey 
 Norman Kerry as Otto Schumann 
 Shirley Grey as Eve 
 Berton Churchill as Windy J. Bailey 
 Matty Kemp as Eddie Ramsey 
 Otis Harlan as Mr. Ramsey 
 Kathrin Clare Ward as Mrs. Ramsey 
 Eddie Fetherston as Pickpocket
 Olin Francis as Guard 
 John Ince as Doctor 
 Lew Meehan as Guard 
 George Morrell as Onlooker

References

Bibliography
 Michael R. Pitts. Poverty Row Studios, 1929–1940: An Illustrated History of 55 Independent Film Companies, with a Filmography for Each. McFarland & Company, 2005.

External links
 

1931 films
1931 crime films
American action films
American crime films
Films directed by Phil Whitman
1930s English-language films
1930s American films